Yufkalı is a village in the Şemdinli District in Hakkâri Province in Turkey. The village is populated by Kurds of the Humaru tribe and had a population of 652 in 2022.

Yufkalı has the five hamlets of Binahare, Elmalı, Kola, Tuğlu and Aşağıtuğlu attached to it.

History 
The village was populated by 20 Assyrian families i n 1877.

Population 
Population history of the village from 2015 to 2022:

References 

Villages in Şemdinli District
Kurdish settlements in Hakkâri Province
Historic Assyrian communities in Turkey